Paul Samson (1953–2002) was an English guitarist.

Paul Samson may also refer to:

Paul Samson (American football) (1879–1967), American football coach
Paul Samson (water polo) (1905–1982), American swimmer and water polo player
Paul Samson-Körner (1887–1942), German heavyweight boxer

See also
Paul Sampson (born 1977), English rugby union player